Max Karl Ernst Ludwig Planck  (23 April 1858 – 4 October 1947) was a German theoretical physicist whose discovery of energy quanta won him the Nobel Prize in Physics in 1918.

Planck made many substantial contributions to theoretical physics, but his fame as a physicist rests primarily on his role as the originator of quantum theory, which revolutionized human understanding of atomic and subatomic processes. In 1948, the German scientific institution Kaiser Wilhelm Society (of which Planck was twice president) was renamed Max Planck Society (MPG). The MPG now includes 83 institutions representing a wide range of scientific directions.

Life and career

Planck came from a traditional, intellectual family. His paternal great-grandfather and grandfather were both theology professors in Göttingen; his father was a law professor at the University of Kiel and Munich. One of his uncles was also a judge.

Planck was born in 1858 in Kiel, Holstein, to Johann Julius Wilhelm Planck and his second wife, Emma Patzig. He was baptized with the name of Karl Ernst Ludwig Marx Planck; of his given names, Marx (a now obsolete variant of Markus or maybe simply an error for Max, which is actually short for Maximilian) was indicated as the "appellation name". However, by the age of ten he signed with the name Max and used this for the rest of his life.

He was the sixth child in the family, though two of his siblings were from his father's first marriage. War was common during Planck's early years  and among his earliest memories was the marching of Prussian and Austrian troops into Kiel during the Second Schleswig War in 1864. In 1867 the family moved to Munich, and Planck enrolled in the Maximilians gymnasium school, where he came under the tutelage of Hermann Müller, a mathematician who took an interest in the youth, and taught him astronomy and mechanics as well as mathematics. It was from Müller that Planck first learned the principle of conservation of energy. Planck graduated early, at age 17. This is how Planck first came in contact with the field of physics.

Planck was gifted when it came to music. He took singing lessons and played piano, organ and cello, and composed songs and operas. However, instead of music he chose to study physics.

The Munich physics professor Philipp von Jolly advised Planck against going into physics, saying, "In this field, almost everything is already discovered, and all that remains is to fill a few holes." Planck replied that he did not wish to discover new things, but only to understand the known fundamentals of the field, and so began his studies in 1874 at the University of Munich. Under Jolly's supervision, Planck performed the only experiments of his scientific career, studying the diffusion of hydrogen through heated platinum, but transferred to theoretical physics.

In 1877, he went to the Friedrich Wilhelms University in Berlin for a year of study with physicists Hermann von Helmholtz and Gustav Kirchhoff and mathematician Karl Weierstrass. He wrote that Helmholtz was never quite prepared, spoke slowly, miscalculated endlessly, and bored his listeners, while Kirchhoff spoke in carefully prepared lectures which were dry and monotonous. He soon became close friends with Helmholtz. While there he undertook a program of mostly self-study of Clausius's writings, which led him to choose thermodynamics as his field.

In October 1878, Planck passed his qualifying exams and in February 1879 defended his dissertation Über den zweiten Hauptsatz der mechanischen Wärmetheorie (On the Second Law of Mechanical Heat Theory). He briefly taught mathematics and physics at his former school in Munich.

By the year 1880, Planck had obtained the two highest academic degrees offered in Europe. The first was a doctorate degree after he completed his paper detailing his research and theory of thermodynamics. He then presented his thesis called Gleichgewichtszustände isotroper Körper in verschiedenen Temperaturen (Equilibrium states of isotropic bodies at different temperatures), which earned him a habilitation.

Academic career
With the completion of his habilitation thesis, Planck became an unpaid Privatdozent (German academic rank comparable to lecturer/assistant professor) in Munich, waiting until he was offered an academic position. Although he was initially ignored by the academic community, he furthered his work on the field of heat theory and discovered one after another the same thermodynamical formalism as Gibbs without realizing it. Clausius's ideas on entropy occupied a central role in his work.

In April 1885, the University of Kiel appointed Planck as associate professor of theoretical physics. Further work on entropy and its treatment, especially as applied in physical chemistry, followed. He published his Treatise on Thermodynamics in 1897. He proposed a thermodynamic basis for Svante Arrhenius's theory of electrolytic dissociation.

In 1889, he was named the successor to Kirchhoff's position at the Friedrich-Wilhelms-Universität in Berlin – presumably thanks to Helmholtz's intercession – and by 1892 became a full professor. In 1907 Planck was offered Boltzmann's position in Vienna, but turned it down to stay in Berlin. During 1909, as a University of Berlin professor, he was invited to become the Ernest Kempton Adams Lecturer in Theoretical Physics at Columbia University in New York City. A series of his lectures were translated and co-published by Columbia University professor A. P. Wills. He retired from Berlin on 10 January 1926, and was succeeded by Erwin Schrödinger.

Family
In March 1887, Planck married Marie Merck (1861–1909), sister of a school fellow, and moved with her into a sublet apartment in Kiel. They had four children: Karl (1888–1916), the twins Emma (1889–1919) and Grete (1889–1917), and Erwin (1893–1945).

After the apartment in Berlin, the Planck family lived in a villa in Berlin-Grunewald, Wangenheimstrasse 21. Several other professors from University of Berlin lived nearby, among them theologian Adolf von Harnack, who became a close friend of Planck. Soon the Planck home became a social and cultural center. Numerous well-known scientists, such as Albert Einstein, Otto Hahn and Lise Meitner were frequent visitors. The tradition of jointly performing music had already been established in the home of Helmholtz.

After several happy years, in July 1909 Marie Planck died, possibly from tuberculosis. In March 1911 Planck married his second wife, Marga von Hoesslin (1882–1948); in December his fifth child Hermann was born.

During the First World War Planck's second son Erwin was taken prisoner by the French in 1914, while his oldest son Karl was killed in action at Verdun. Grete died in 1917 while giving birth to her first child. Her sister died the same way two years later, after having married Grete's widower. Both granddaughters survived and were named after their mothers. Planck endured these losses stoically.

In January 1945, Erwin, to whom he had been particularly close, was sentenced to death by the Nazi Volksgerichtshof because of his participation in the failed attempt to assassinate Hitler in July 1944. Erwin was executed on 23 January 1945.

Professor at Berlin University
As a professor at the Friedrich-Wilhelms-Universität in Berlin, Planck joined the local Physical Society. He later wrote about this time: "In those days I was essentially the only theoretical physicist there, whence things were not so easy for me, because I started mentioning entropy, but this was not quite fashionable, since it was regarded as a mathematical spook". Thanks to his initiative, the various local Physical Societies of Germany merged in 1898 to form the German Physical Society (Deutsche Physikalische Gesellschaft, DPG); from 1905 to 1909 Planck was the president.

Planck started a six-semester course of lectures on theoretical physics, "dry, somewhat impersonal" according to Lise Meitner, "using no notes, never making mistakes, never faltering; the best lecturer I ever heard" according to an English participant, James R. Partington, who continues: "There were always many standing around the room. As the lecture-room was well heated and rather close, some of the listeners would from time to time drop to the floor, but this did not disturb the lecture." Planck did not establish an actual "school"; the number of his graduate students was only about 20, among them:

1897 Max Abraham (1875–1922)
1903 Max von Laue (1879–1960)
1904 Moritz Schlick (1882–1936)
1906 Walther Meissner (1882–1974)
1907 Fritz Reiche (1883–1960)
1912 Walter Schottky (1886–1976)
1914 Walther Bothe (1891–1957)

Black-body radiation
In 1894, Planck turned his attention to the problem of black-body radiation. The problem had been stated by Kirchhoff in 1859: "how does the intensity of the electromagnetic radiation emitted by a black body (a perfect absorber, also known as a cavity radiator) depend on the frequency of the radiation (i.e., the color of the light) and the temperature of the body?". The question had been explored experimentally, but no theoretical treatment agreed with experimental values (i.e., with experimentally observed evidence). Wilhelm Wien proposed Wien's law, which correctly predicted the behaviour at high frequencies, but failed at low frequencies. The Rayleigh–Jeans law, another approach to the problem, agreed with experimental results at low frequencies, but created what was later known as the "ultraviolet catastrophe" at high frequencies, as predicted by classical physics. However, contrary to many textbooks, this was not a motivation for Planck.

Planck's first proposed solution to the problem in 1899 followed from what he called the "principle of elementary disorder", which allowed him to derive Wien's law from a number of assumptions about the entropy of an ideal oscillator, creating what was referred to as the Wien–Planck law. Soon, however, it was found that experimental evidence did not confirm the new law at all, to Planck's frustration. He revised his approach and now derived the first version of the famous Planck black-body radiation law, which described clearly the experimentally observed black-body spectrum. It was first proposed in a meeting of the DPG on 19 October 1900 and published in 1901. (This first derivation did not include energy quantisation, and did not use statistical mechanics, to which he held an aversion.) In November 1900 Planck revised this first version, now relying on Boltzmann's statistical interpretation of the second law of thermodynamics as a way of gaining a more fundamental understanding of the principles behind his radiation law. Planck was deeply suspicious of the philosophical and physical implications of such an interpretation of Boltzmann's approach; thus his recourse to them was, as he later put it, "an act of despair ... I was ready to sacrifice any of my previous convictions about physics".

The central assumption behind his new derivation, presented to the DPG on 14 December 1900, was the supposition, now known as the Planck postulate, that electromagnetic energy could be emitted only in quantized form, in other words, the energy could only be a multiple of an elementary unit:

Physicists now call these quanta photons, and a photon of frequency  will have its own specific and unique energy. The total energy at that frequency is then equal to  multiplied by the number of photons at that frequency.

At first Planck considered that quantisation was only "a purely formal assumption ... actually I did not think much about it ..."; nowadays this assumption, incompatible with classical physics, is regarded as the birth of quantum physics and the greatest intellectual accomplishment of Planck's career. (Ludwig Boltzmann had been discussing in a theoretical paper in 1877 the possibility that the energy states of a physical system could be discrete). The discovery of Planck's constant enabled him to define a new universal set of physical units (such as the Planck length and the Planck mass), all based on fundamental physical constants upon which much of quantum theory is based. In recognition of Planck's fundamental contribution to a new branch of physics, he was awarded the Nobel Prize in Physics for 1918; (he actually received the award in 1919).

Subsequently, Planck tried to grasp the meaning of energy quanta, but to no avail. "My unavailing attempts to somehow reintegrate the action quantum into classical theory extended over several years and caused me much trouble." Even several years later, other physicists like Rayleigh, Jeans, and Lorentz set Planck's constant to zero in order to align with classical physics, but Planck knew well that this constant had a precise nonzero value. "I am unable to understand Jeans' stubbornness – he is an example of a theoretician as should never be existing, the same as Hegel was for philosophy. So much the worse for the facts if they don't fit."

Max Born wrote about Planck: "He was, by nature, a conservative mind; he had nothing of the revolutionary and was thoroughly skeptical about speculations. Yet his belief in the compelling force of logical reasoning from facts was so strong that he did not flinch from announcing the most revolutionary idea which ever has shaken physics."

Einstein and the theory of relativity

In 1905, the three epochal papers by Albert Einstein were published in the journal Annalen der Physik. Planck was among the few who immediately recognized the significance of the special theory of relativity. Thanks to his influence, this theory was soon widely accepted in Germany. Planck also contributed considerably to extend the special theory of relativity. For example, he recast the theory in terms of classical action.

Einstein's hypothesis of light quanta (photons), based on Heinrich Hertz's 1887 discovery (and further investigation by Philipp Lenard) of the photoelectric effect, was initially rejected by Planck. He was unwilling to discard completely Maxwell's theory of electrodynamics. "The theory of light would be thrown back not by decades, but by centuries, into the age when Christiaan Huygens dared to fight against the mighty emission theory of Isaac Newton ..."

In 1910, Einstein pointed out the anomalous behavior of specific heat at low temperatures as another example of a phenomenon which defies explanation by classical physics. Planck and Nernst, seeking to clarify the increasing number of contradictions, organized the First Solvay Conference (Brussels 1911). At this meeting Einstein was able to convince Planck.

Meanwhile, Planck had been appointed dean of Berlin University, whereby it was possible for him to call Einstein to Berlin and establish a new professorship for him (1914). Soon the two scientists became close friends and met frequently to play music together.

First World War

At the onset of the First World War Planck endorsed the general excitement of the public, writing that, "Besides much that is horrible, there is also much that is unexpectedly great and beautiful: the smooth solution of the most difficult domestic political problems by the unification of all parties (and) ... the extolling of everything good and noble." Planck also signed the infamous "Manifesto of the 93 intellectuals", a pamphlet of polemic war propaganda (while Einstein retained a strictly pacifistic attitude which almost led to his imprisonment, only being spared thanks to his Swiss citizenship).

In 1915, when Italy was still a neutral power, Planck voted successfully for a scientific paper from Italy, which received a prize from the Prussian Academy of Sciences, where Planck was one of four permanent presidents.

Post-war and the Weimar Republic
In the turbulent post-war years, Planck, now the highest authority of German physics, issued the slogan "persevere and continue working" to his colleagues.

In October 1920, he and Fritz Haber established the Notgemeinschaft der Deutschen Wissenschaft (Emergency Organization of German Science), aimed at providing financial support for scientific research. A considerable portion of the money the organization would distribute was raised abroad.

Planck also held leading positions at Berlin University, the Prussian Academy of Sciences, the German Physical Society and the Kaiser Wilhelm Society (which became the Max Planck Society in 1948). During this time economic conditions in Germany were such that he was hardly able to conduct research. In 1926, Planck became a foreign member of the Royal Netherlands Academy of Arts and Sciences.

During the interwar period, Planck became a member of the Deutsche Volks-Partei (German People's Party), the party of Nobel Peace Prize laureate Gustav Stresemann, which aspired to liberal aims for domestic policy and rather revisionistic aims for politics around the world.

Planck disagreed with the introduction of universal suffrage and later expressed the view that the Nazi dictatorship resulted from "the ascent of the rule of the crowds".

Quantum mechanics

At the end of the 1920s, Bohr, Heisenberg and Pauli had worked out the Copenhagen interpretation of quantum mechanics, but it was rejected by Planck, and by Schrödinger, Laue, and Einstein as well. Planck expected that wave mechanics would soon render quantum theoryhis own childunnecessary. This was not to be the case, however. Further work only served to underscore the enduring central importance of quantum theory, even against his and Einstein's philosophical revulsions. Here Planck experienced the truth of his own earlier observation from his struggle with the older views during  his younger years: "A new scientific truth does not triumph by convincing its opponents and making them see the light, but rather because its opponents eventually die, and a new generation grows up that is familiar with it."

Nazi dictatorship and the Second World War
When the Nazis came to power in 1933, Planck was 74 years old. He witnessed many Jewish friends and colleagues expelled from their positions and humiliated, and hundreds of scientists emigrate from Nazi Germany. Again he tried to "persevere and continue working" and asked scientists who were considering emigration to remain in Germany. Nevertheless, he did help his nephew, the economist Hermann Kranold, to emigrate to London after his arrest. He hoped the crisis would abate soon and the political situation would improve.

Otto Hahn asked Planck to gather well-known German professors in order to issue a public proclamation against the treatment of Jewish professors, but Planck replied, "If you are able to gather today 30 such gentlemen, then tomorrow 150 others will come and speak against it, because they are eager to take over the positions of the others." Under Planck's leadership, the Kaiser Wilhelm Society (KWG) avoided open conflict with the Nazi regime, except concerning the Jewish Fritz Haber. Planck tried to discuss the issue with the recently appointed Chancellor of Germany Adolf Hitler, but was unsuccessful, as to Hitler "the Jews are all Communists, and these are my enemies." In the following year, 1934, Haber died in exile.

One year later, Planck, having been the president of the KWG since 1930, organized in a somewhat provocative style an official commemorative meeting for Haber. He also succeeded in secretly enabling a number of Jewish scientists to continue working in institutes of the KWG for several years. In 1936, his term as president of the KWG ended, and the Nazi government pressured him to refrain from seeking another term.

As the political climate in Germany gradually became more hostile, Johannes Stark, prominent exponent of Deutsche Physik ("German Physics", also called "Aryan Physics") attacked Planck, Sommerfeld and Heisenberg for continuing to teach the theories of Einstein, calling them "white Jews". The "Hauptamt Wissenschaft" (Nazi government office for science) started an investigation of Planck's ancestry, claiming that he was "1/16 Jewish", but Planck himself denied it.

In 1938, Planck celebrated his 80th birthday. The DPG held a celebration, during which the Max-Planck medal (founded as the highest medal by the DPG in 1928) was awarded to French physicist Louis de Broglie. At the end of 1938, the Prussian Academy lost its remaining independence and was taken over by Nazis (Gleichschaltung). Planck protested by resigning his presidency. He continued to travel frequently, giving numerous public talks, such as his talk on Religion and Science, and five years later he was sufficiently fit to climb 3,000-metre peaks in the Alps.

During the Second World War the increasing number of Allied bombing missions against Berlin forced Planck and his wife to temporarily leave the city and live in the countryside. In 1942, he wrote: "In me an ardent desire has grown to persevere this crisis and live long enough to be able to witness the turning point, the beginning of a new rise." In February 1944, his home in Berlin was completely destroyed by an air raid, annihilating all his scientific records and correspondence. His rural retreat was threatened by the rapid advance of the Allied armies from both sides.

In 1944, Planck's son Erwin was arrested by the Gestapo following the attempted assassination of Hitler in the 20 July plot. He was tried and sentenced to death by the People's Court in October 1944. Erwin was hanged at Berlin's Plötzensee Prison in January 1945. The death of his son destroyed much of Planck's will to live. After the war had ended, Planck, his second wife, and their son were brought to a relative in Göttingen, where Planck died on October 4, 1947. His grave is situated in the old Stadtfriedhof (City Cemetery) in Göttingen.

Religious views
Planck was a member of the Lutheran Church in Germany. He was very tolerant towards alternative views and religions.
In a lecture in 1937 entitled "Religion und Naturwissenschaft" ("Religion and Natural Science") he suggested the importance of these symbols and rituals related directly with a believer's ability to worship God, but that one must be mindful that the symbols provide an imperfect illustration of divinity. He criticized atheism for being focused on the derision of such symbols, while at the same time warned of the over-estimation of the importance of such symbols by believers.

Planck was tolerant and favorable to all religions. Although he remained in the Lutheran Church, he did not promote Christian or Biblical views. He believed "the faith in miracles must yield, step by step, before the steady and firm advance of the facts of science, and its total defeat is undoubtedly a matter of time."

In "Religion und Naturwissenschaft", Planck expressed the view that God is everywhere present, and held that "the holiness of the unintelligible Godhead is conveyed by the holiness of symbols." Atheists, he thought, attach too much importance to what are merely symbols. He was a churchwarden from 1920 until his death, and believed in an almighty, all-knowing, beneficent God (though not necessarily a personal one). Both science and religion wage a "tireless battle against skepticism and dogmatism, against unbelief and superstition" with the goal "toward God!"

Planck said in 1944, "As a man who has devoted his whole life to the most clear headed science, to the study of matter, I can tell you as a result of my research about atoms this much: There is no matter as such. All matter originates and exists only by virtue of a force which brings the particle of an atom to vibration and holds this most minute solar system of the atom together. We must assume behind this force the existence of a conscious and intelligent spirit [orig. geist]. This spirit is the matrix of all matter."

Planck argued that the concept of God is important to both religion and science, but in different ways: "Both religion and science require a belief in God. For believers, God is in the beginning, and for physicists He is at the end of all considerations … To the former He is the foundation, to the latter, the crown of the edifice of every generalized world view".

Furthermore, Planck wrote, ..."to believe" means "to recognize as a truth," and the knowledge of nature, continually advancing on incontestably safe tracks, has made it utterly impossible for a person possessing some training in natural science to recognize as founded on truth the many reports of extraordinary occurrences contradicting the laws of nature, of miracles which are still commonly regarded as essential supports and confirmations of religious doctrines, and which formerly used to be accepted as facts pure and simple, without doubt or criticism. The belief in miracles must retreat step by step before relentlessly and reliably progressing science and we cannot doubt that sooner or later it must vanish completely.

Noted historian of science John L. Heilbron characterized Planck's views on God as deistic. Heilbron further relates that when asked about his religious affiliation, Planck replied that although he had always been deeply religious, he did not believe "in a personal God, let alone a Christian God."

Publications

 Translated in 
 Translated in 

 Translated in

See also
List of things named after Max Planck
German inventors and discoverers
Photon polarization
Statue of Max Planck
Zero-point energy

References

Sources
 Aczel, Amir D. Entanglement, Chapter 4. (Penguin, 2003) 
 
 Pickover, Clifford A. Archimedes to Hawking: Laws of Science and the Great Minds Behind Them, Oxford University Press, 2008, 
 
 Rosenthal-Schneider, Ilse Reality and Scientific Truth: Discussions with Einstein, von Laue, and Planck (Wayne State University, 1980)

External links

 
 
 
 
 Annotated bibliography for Max Planck from the Alsos Digital Library for Nuclear Issues
 Max Planck – Encyclopædia Britannica article
 Max Planck Biography – www.nobel-prize-winners.com
 Max Planck Institutes of Natural Science and Astrophysics
 Max Planck – Selbstdarstellung im Filmportrait (1942), [Cinematic self-portrait of Max Planck], Berlin-Brandenburgische Akademie der Wissenschaften, 1942
  including the Nobel Lecture, 2 June 1920 The Genesis and Present State of Development of the Quantum Theory
 Life–Work–Personality – Exhibition on the 50th anniversary of Planck's death
 

 
1858 births
1947 deaths
19th-century German physicists
20th-century German physicists
Scientists from Kiel
People from the Duchy of Holstein
German deists
Former Lutherans
German Nobel laureates
Foreign associates of the National Academy of Sciences
Foreign Members of the Royal Society
Members of the Pontifical Academy of Sciences
Members of the Prussian Academy of Sciences
Members of the Royal Netherlands Academy of Arts and Sciences
Corresponding members of the Saint Petersburg Academy of Sciences
Corresponding Members of the Russian Academy of Sciences (1917–1925)
Honorary Members of the USSR Academy of Sciences
Nobel laureates in Physics
Recipients of the Copley Medal
Quantum physicists
Optical physicists
Recipients of the Pour le Mérite (civil class)
Lorentz Medal winners
Creators of temperature scales
German People's Party politicians
Ludwig Maximilian University of Munich alumni
Academic staff of the Ludwig Maximilian University of Munich
Humboldt University of Berlin alumni
Academic staff of the Humboldt University of Berlin
Academic staff of the University of Kiel
Theoretical physicists
Max Planck Society people
Winners of the Max Planck Medal
Members of the Bavarian Academy of Sciences